José Francisco Malavé [mah-lah-VEY] (born May 31, 1971) is a Venezuelan former Major League Baseball outfielder who played from 1996 to 1997 with the Boston Red Sox. He was born in Cumaná, Sucre.

In parts of two seasons, Malavé was a .226 hitter with four home runs and 17 RBI in 45 career games.

Besides, he played in Italian, Japanese, Korean and Mexican baseball.

Malavé also served as third base coach for the Venezuela national baseball team in the 2009 World Baseball Classic.

See also
 List of Major League Baseball players from Venezuela

External links

Mexican League batting statistics
Venezuelan Professional Baseball League batting and fielding statistics

1971 births
Living people
People from Cumaná
Boston Red Sox players
Broncos de Reynosa players
Caribes de Anzoátegui players
Carolina Mudcats players
Elmira Pioneers players
Gulf Coast Red Sox players
Haitai Tigers players
Leones del Caracas players
Lynchburg Red Sox players
Major League Baseball outfielders
Major League Baseball players from Venezuela
Mexican League baseball first basemen
Mexican League baseball left fielders
Mexican League baseball right fielders
Nashua Pride players
Navegantes del Magallanes players
New Britain Red Sox players
Pawtucket Red Sox players
Rimini Baseball Club players
Rojos del Águila de Veracruz players
St. Paul Saints players
Saraperos de Saltillo players
Sioux City Explorers players
Tecolotes de los Dos Laredos players
Venezuelan expatriate baseball players in Italy
Venezuelan expatriate baseball players in Japan
Venezuelan expatriate baseball players in Mexico
Venezuelan expatriate baseball players in South Korea
Venezuelan expatriate baseball players in the United States
Winter Haven Red Sox players
Yokohama BayStars players